Statler may refer to:

Characters 

 Statler (Muppet), a Muppet character
 Statler and Waldorf: From the Balcony, a webshow featuring the Muppet

Music 
 Statler & Waldorf (musicians), a music production group named after the Muppets
 The Statler Brothers, a country music group

Places 
 Statler Hotels,  a chain of luxury hotels
 Statler Hills
 Statler Arms Apartments, high-rise in Cleveland
 Statler Fountain, a 1930 fountain installed in Boston's Statler Park

Surname 
 Alfred Statler (1916–1984), American painter and magazine photographer
 Ellsworth Milton Statler (1863–1928), founder of Statler Hotels

See also 
 Hotel Statler (disambiguation)
 Statler chicken